Richard Purcell was an Irish architect and builder active in mid-nineteenth-century County Wexford, in the southeast of Ireland. He was associated with the Day family of architects, which included Martin Day, William Day, John Day.

References

Irish architects
People from County Wexford
Year of death missing
Year of birth missing